Svitlana Ivanivna Kyselyova (born 25 August 1971) is a Ukrainian dressage rider.  She represented Ukraine at the 2012 Summer Olympics in the individual dressage, finishing 46th.

References

1971 births
Living people
Sportspeople from Mykolaiv
Ukrainian female equestrians
Ukrainian dressage riders
Olympic equestrians of Ukraine
Equestrians at the 2012 Summer Olympics